Trgovište (Cyrillic: Трговиште) is a village in the municipality of Novi Grad, Bosnia and Herzegovina.

References

Villages in Republika Srpska
Populated places in Novi Grad, Bosnia and Herzegovina